Grant Fisher (born April 22, 1997) is a Canadian-born American professional middle- and long-distance runner. He placed fifth in the 10,000 meters at the 2020 Tokyo Olympics and fourth at the 2022 World Athletics Championships. Fisher holds North American records in the 3000 meters, 5000 m and 10,000 m, all set in 2022.

As a high-schooler, he was named Gatorade Player of the Year for cross country for the 2013–2014 and 2014–2015 seasons. On June 4, 2015, he became the seventh American high school student to run a mile under four minutes. An eleven-time All-American, Fisher won the 2017 NCAA Outdoor Track and Field 5000 m championship (14:35.60), becoming the first American underclassman to do so in 28 years. The following year, he placed third in the same event with a time of 13:55.04, just missing Syracuse's Justyn Knight (13:55.03) and his Stanford Cardinal teammate Sean McGorty (13:54.81).

Running career

Early life and high school
While living in Grand Blanc, Michigan, Fisher began running in the spring of his seventh grade year, after joining his middle school cross country team. When he became a freshman in high school, Fisher joined both the soccer and cross country teams, where he made varsity for both.

In 2011, Fisher qualified for the state cross country meet and ran a 16:14 to finish 28th. In the Spring of 2012, he qualified for the state meet in the 1600 meter run, he ran a 4:30.23.

In the fall of his sophomore year (November 2012), he missed the Michigan state cross country meet because he had to play for his soccer team in the state finals game. In the spring of 2013, he ran personal bests of 3:50.30 at the IAAF World Youth Championships in Athletics in the 1500 meter run, 4:11.27 in the 1600 meter at the KLAA Lakes Conference Meet, 4:12.74 in the mile run at the New Balance Outdoor Nationals meet, and 8:32.65 in the 3000 at the USATF World Youth Trials, and 9:04.33 in the 3200 at the Michigan state meet.

In the fall of his junior year (2013), he had personal bests of 15:02 at the Foot Locker Midwest Regional to win the event. Fisher then went on to the Foot Locker Nationals, which he won as well.  In the spring of his junior year (2014), Fisher set personal bests of 1:55.76 in the 800 meter run, 3:49.62 in the 1500 meters at the World Junior Championships, 4:10.82 in the 1600 meter to win the division one state meet in Michigan, a 4:02.02 in the mile to win the event at the Adidas Grand Prix, 8:55.75 in the 3200 meter run to win JD's Invitational, and an 8:51.28 in the two mile run to win the event at the Brooks PR Invitational.

The fall of his senior year (2014), Fisher ran a 14:43.00 to win the Portage Invitational and a 15:03 to win 2014 Foot Locker Nationals. This victory made Fisher one of only 5 boys to ever win two Foot Locker national titles (the others included Abdirizak Mohamud, Lukas Verzbicas, Edward Cheserek, and Dathan Ritzenhein). In Spring of 2015, Grant Fisher became the 7th high school athlete to break 4 minutes in the mile, tying Matthew Maton's time of 3:59.38.

Collegiate
Fisher committed to run at Stanford University on November 16, 2014.

At the end of his freshman year cross country season at Stanford, Fisher placed 17th overall at the 2015 NCAA DI XC Championships in 30:07.9. In the winter 2015-16 indoor season, Fisher won 3000 meters on February 13, 2016, in Seattle (2016 Husky Classic) with a personal best 7:50.06.

At the 2017 NCAA Division I Outdoor Track and Field Championships, Fisher won the 5000 meters race. The race was tactical and his time of 14:35.60 was the slowest winning mark in an NCAA final since 1995. It also made Fisher the first American underclassmen to win the NCAA title in 28 years.

Fisher placed 5th at the 2017 NCAA Division I Cross Country Championships. At the 2018 NCAA Division I Outdoor Track and Field Championships, Fisher placed 3rd in the 5000m behind Stanford Cardinal men's track and field teammate and 2018 5000 meters champion Sean McGorty.

Fisher placed 2nd at 2018 NCAA Division I Cross Country Championships leading Stanford Cardinals to a 5th-place team finish.

Fisher placed 2nd in DMR  with Stanford Cardinal teammates (Alex Ostberg, Isaiah Brandt-Sims, Isaac Cortes, Grant Fisher) and 3000 meters at 2019 NCAA Division I Indoor Track and Field Championships.

Fisher earned twelve NCAA Division I All-America awards from the USTFCCCA.

Professional career

2020

Fisher placed 4th in the 3000m at the Boston University Last Chance Invitational on February 27, 2020. His teammates Lopez Lomong, Ryan Hill, and Evan Jager finished ahead of him. Grant's time of 7:39.99 was a PR for the distance and his first time under 7:40.

In the summer of 2020, Bowerman Track Club held several intrasquad meets in due to the lack of the races during the COVID-19 pandemic. During these races, Fisher set new PRs of 3:36.23 for 1500m and 13:11.68 for 5000m. He was also part of the  team who broke the American Record in 14:34.97. The meets were held in undisclosed locations around Portland, Oregon.

2021

Fisher opened up his 2021 season with a 3000m PR of 7:37.21, finishing second to teammate Marc Scott. Fisher ran this time at the Prickly Pear Invitational in Phoenix, AZ on February 6, 2021. Fisher ran a new 10000m PR of 27:11.29 on February 20, 2021, at the TEN invitational meet in Los Angeles, CA. Again finishing second to Scott, the time made Fisher the fifth fastest American ever over the distance and met the Olympic qualifying standard.

On March 6, 2021, Fisher won the Men's 5000m at the Sound Running Invite in Southern California. His time of 13:02.53 was a personal record and the 13th fastest time ever run by an American. Fisher went through 3000 meters in 7:55.20 and his last lap of 55.38 was the fastest in the field by over 2 seconds.

Fisher finished 4th in the 1500m at the Track Meet in Irvine, California held on May 15 with a time of 3:36.52. His Bowerman teammate Matthew Centrowitz won the race. As a final tune-up for the Olympic trials, he won the second heat of the Portland Track Festival 5000m on May 29 in a meet record 13:19.52 over teammate Woody Kincaid. The meet record was formerly held by Dathan Ritzenhein from his 13:19.78 performance in the 2012 edition of the meet.

Fisher finished second in the U.S. Olympic Team Trials 10,000m to make his first Olympic team. The meet was held at the reconstructed Hayward Field in Eugene, Oregon with Fisher's race taking place on the first day of competition, June 18. It was a close finish between 1st placer Kincaid (27:53.62) and 3rd placer Joe Klecker of On Running (27:54.90) while Fisher ran 27:54.29. All three qualifiers ran their last lap in under 55 seconds, with Kincaid having the fastest last lap of 53.47. The top three were well ahead of 4th placer Ben True, 4 seconds back from Klecker.

Fisher doubled back in the 5000m on June 27 at the trials to take second in 13:27.01 behind 2016 Olympic silver medalist Paul Chelimo and just ahead of teammate Kincaid. Fisher's time was 13:27.01 as just .31 seconds separated the top 3. Kincaid had the fastest last lap of the field in 52.74 and all three qualifiers closed under 53 seconds, a finish that is usually world class. Oregon's Cooper Teare finished 4th in 13:28.08. Fisher and Kincaid opted to run both events in the Tokyo 2020 Olympic Games.

At the 2020 Summer Olympics, Fisher finished the 10,000m event with a time of 27:46.39, placing 5th overall and the fastest American in the field. He returned to the track to finish 9th in the 5000m event with a time of 13:08.40.

2022

Fisher opened his 2022 season on February 12 at the Boston University David Hemery Valentine Invitational by setting a new American indoor record in the 5000m with a time of 12:53.73, beating the previous American record held by Galen Rupp of 13:01.26.

On March 6, he won "The Ten" at the Sound Running Invite as his second race of the season. His time of 26:33.84 set a new American outdoor record and a North American Record in the 10,000m. This time makes him 7th on the all-time list for the 10,000m distance.

On May 27, Fisher got second in the USATF 10k championship with a time of 28.28.81. On June 26, he won the USATF 5k Championship with a time of 13:03.86.

On July 17, he placed fourth in the 10,000m at the 2022 World Athletics Championships.

Fisher set four North American records that year (also in the outdoor 3000m and 5000m), and became the first American to break 12:50 in the 5000m and 26:40 in the 10,000m.

Major competition record

Personal life
Grant Fisher was born in Calgary, Alberta, on April 22, 1997, to Dan and Sonia Fisher. He has an older sister, Hailey, and a younger brother, Mark. He grew up in Grand Blanc, Michigan and attended Stanford University in Palo Alto, California. In addition to running, Fisher was an avid soccer player. He began playing the sport when he was four years old and in high school was a member of the Michigan Wolves, an elite level club team. Fisher now lives in Portland, Oregon, and trains with the Bowerman Track Club under the guidance of Coach Jerry Schumacher.

Personal records

High school
 800 m: 1:55.76
 1500 m: 3:42.89 
 1500 m indoor: 3:46.41
 1600 m: 4:00.08
 One Mile: 3:59.38
 One Mile indoor: 4:03.24 
 3000 m: 8:32.65
 3200 m: 8:53.41
 Two Mile: 8:43.57
 5000 m: 14:43.00
 5000 m indoor: 14:51.19

Collegiate
 800 m: 1:51.86 
 1500 m: 3:39.60 
 3000 m indoor: 7:42.62 
 5000 m: 13:29.52 
 8K (XC): 23:09.8 
 10K (XC): 29:08.8

Professional
Information from World Athletics profile.
 1500 m: 3:35.53 (Portland, OR 2022)
 3000 m: 7:28.48 (Monaco 2022) North American record
 3000 m indoor: 7:35.82 (Liévin 2023)
 5000 m: 12:46.96 (Brussels 2022) North American record
 5000 m indoor: 12:53.73 (Boston, MA 2022)
 10,000 m: 26:33.84 (San Juan Capistrano, CA 2022) North American record

References

1997 births
Living people
American male long-distance runners
Athletes from Calgary
People from Grand Blanc, Michigan
Stanford Cardinal men's track and field athletes
American male middle-distance runners
Stanford Cardinal men's cross country runners
Athletes (track and field) at the 2020 Summer Olympics
Olympic male long-distance runners
Olympic track and field athletes of the United States
USA Outdoor Track and Field Championships winners
World Athletics Championships athletes for the United States